"Me Colé en Una Fiesta" (Spanish for "I Snuck Into a Party") is a song written and performed by the Spanish band Mecano. It was released as the third single of their debut studio album Mecano by Discos CBS on March 22, 1982.

After the release of two singles, "Hoy No Me Puedo Levantar" almost a year before and "Perdido en Mi Habitación", Mecano released the song when yet they weren't that well known.

Right after its release the song become a smash hit in Spain and later one of Mecano's most acclaimed songs. "Me Colé en Una Fiesta" was their third song to reach top ten and first song to top the Spanish chart where it spent one week. The song was also a commercial success, topping the Spanish Singles selling chart for six weeks, it was certified platinum for selling 100.000 units in the country.

The success of the single also made its first single "Hoy No Me Puedo Levantar" to success, mainly because its promotion and radio airplay. Despite the success "Me Colé en Una Fiesta" had, it didn't make "Hoy No Me Puedo Levantar" to number one but yet reached number two. All this stardom led Mecano to become the best selling group in singles and convinced the discography to record their first studio album.

A music video of the Spanish version of the song was also released to promote the single. However it isn't included in the Mecano's official videography because of the group disliking the video and the low quality it has compared to the rest of their music videos.

Because of the success in Spain of the song an English language version named as "The Uninvited Guest" was released in some European music markets as in Netherlands, United Kingdom and Italy as a check from the discography Discos CBS to get to know Mecano internationally but despite of the success the song received in Spain, the English version did not succeed in Europe and later this version of the song become a rarity.

In popular culture, the song is well known for its catch line "Coca-Cola para todos y algo de comer" ("Coca-Cola for everyone and something to eat"). Line which is often used to refer to the song.

Background and composition 

Inspired by a party propelled by "La movida Madrileña" on which Mecano snuck into when they weren't so known. It was written by member Ignacio Cano who wrote all tracks from Mecano (1982) but "Hoy No Me Puedo Levantar" who was written by his brother José Cano. The track was produced by his brother José Cano and the Argentinean producer Jorge Álvarez.

The single's B side “Boda en Londres” (“Wedding in London”) was chosen to be released as the B side of the single in honor of Lady Diana, Prince of Wales and his majesty the King Charles III's wedding the year before. On the European market rarity the track was named as just “London”.

Formats 

7 inch 1982 Spanish release

7 inch 1983 Europe release

Charts

References 

1982 singles